Nelson may refer to the following places in the U.S. state of Arizona:
Nelson, Pima County, Arizona, an unincorporated community and census-designated place
Nelson, Yavapai County, Arizona, an unincorporated community